The 1987 European Aquatics Championships, organized by the Ligue Européenne de Natation, were held in an indoor pool (50 m) in Strasbourg, France from 16 August to 23 August 1987. Besides swimming there were titles contested in diving, synchronized swimming (women) and water polo. For the first time the 50 m freestyle event was included in the tournament.

Medal table

Swimming

Men's events

Women's events

Diving

Men's events

Women's events

Synchronized swimming

Water polo

External links
Swimming results

LEN European Aquatics Championships
European Aquatics Championships, 1987
European Aquatics
International aquatics competitions hosted by France
Sports competitions in Strasbourg
August 1987 sports events in Europe
20th century in Strasbourg